San Miguel is a town in Central Peru, capital of the province La Mar in the region Ayacucho.

References

Populated places in the Ayacucho Region